The Nussinov algorithm is a nucleic acid structure prediction algorithm used in computational biology to predict the folding of an RNA molecule that makes use of dynamic programming principles. The algorithm was developed by Ruth Nussinov in the late 1970s.

Background 
RNA origami occurs when an RNA molecule "folds" and binds to itself. This folding often determines the function of the RNA molecule. RNA folds at different levels, this algorithm predicts the secondary structure of the RNA.

Algorithm

Scoring 
We score a solution by counting the total number of paired bases. Thus, attempting to maximize the score that maximizes the total number of bonds between bases.

Motivation 
Consider an RNA sequence  whose elements are taken from the set .

Algorithm 
Consider an RNA sequence  of length  such that .

Construct an  matrix . Initialize  such that

 will contain the maximum score for the subsequence . Now, fill in entries of  up and to the right, so that

where 

To determine the structure of the folded RNA by traceback, we first create an empty list of pairs . Then, we follow one of three scenarios.

 If , the procedure stops.
 If , then set  and continue.

When the traceback finishes,  contains all of the paired bases.

Limitations 
The Nussinov algorithm does not account for the three-dimensional shape of RNA, nor predict RNA pseudoknots. Furthermore, in its basic form, it does not account for a minimum stem loop size. However, it is still useful as a fast algorithm for basic prediction of secondary structure.

References 

Bioinformatics algorithms